The Night Caller may refer to:

 The Night Caller (1965 film), a British film
 The Night Caller (1998 film), an American film
 Fear Over the City (Peur sur la ville), a 1975 French film, also known as The Night Caller
 The Night Caller, a nickname for  Australian serial killer Eric Edgar Cooke